The KUR EC5 class was a class of  gauge  Garratt-type articulated steam locomotives built during the latter stages of World War II by Beyer, Peacock & Co. in Gorton, Manchester, England, for the War Department of the United Kingdom.  The two members of the class entered service on the Kenya-Uganda Railway (KUR) in 1945.  They were part of a batch of 20 locomotives, the rest of which were sent to either India or Burma.

The following year, 1946, four locomotives from that batch were acquired by the Tanganyika Railway (TR) from Burma.  They entered service on the TR as the TR GB class.

In 1949, upon the merger of the KUR and the TR to form the East African Railways (EAR), the EC5 and GB classes were combined as the EAR 55 class.  In 1952, the EAR acquired five more of the War Department batch of 20 from Burma, where they had been Burma Railways class GD; these five locomotives were then added to the EAR 55 class, bringing the total number of that class to 11 units.

Class list
The builders and fleet numbers of each member of the EAR 55 class were as follows:

See also

History of rail transport in Tanzania
Rail transport in Kenya
Rail transport in Uganda

References

Notes

Bibliography

External links

Beyer, Peacock locomotives
East African Railways locomotives
Garratt locomotives
Kenya-Uganda Railway locomotives
Metre gauge steam locomotives
Railway locomotives introduced in 1945
Steam locomotives of Kenya
Steam locomotives of Tanzania
Steam locomotives of Uganda
Tanganyika Railway locomotives
4-8-2+2-8-4 locomotives